Abner Kirk "Trey" Junkin III (born January 23, 1961) is a former American football long snapper in the National Football League (NFL). Junkin played college football at Louisiana Tech University. Although considered one of the forefathers of the modern long snappers, Junkin also played at the tight end and linebacker positions.

Early years
Junkin attended Northeast High School in North Little Rock, Arkansas, and was a football star.

Professional career
Junkin played 19 seasons in the NFL for six different teams: Buffalo Bills (1983–1984), Washington Redskins (1984), Los Angeles/Oakland Raiders (1985–1989, 1996), Seattle Seahawks (1990–1995), Arizona Cardinals (1996–2001), plus a single game with the New York Giants in 2002. Primarily a long snapper and special teams player throughout his career, Junkin started out as a linebacker and later moved to tight end.

It is his one game with the Giants for which Junkin is most remembered. The Giants coaxed the retired veteran back to replace an injured Dan O'Leary. In a 2002 Wild Card playoff game against the San Francisco 49ers, Junkin botched a snap on a field goal attempt that could have won the game for the Giants, who had squandered a 38-14 lead. Holder Matt Allen attempted to pass the ball to Rich Seubert, but it fell incomplete. There was an uncalled pass interference penalty on the play, which could have led to another field goal attempt as a result of off-setting penalties, as the Giants were penalized for having an ineligible man downfield. Junkin took full responsibility and said that the Giants lost this game because of him. This play ultimately became #10 on NFL Top 10's Top Ten Meltdowns and Top Ten Controversial Calls at #7.

After the 2002 NFL season, Junkin went on to coach in the Canadian Football League for the Calgary Stampeders. After a short stint with the Stampeders, he rejoined his family in Winnfield, Louisiana. Junkin is now the defensive coordinator for his son Connor's high school football team, the Winnfield Senior High Tigers.

Junkin is the older brother of former NFL linebacker Mike Junkin.

References

1961 births
Living people
People from Conway, Arkansas
American football tight ends
American football long snappers
Louisiana Tech Bulldogs football players
Buffalo Bills players
Washington Redskins players
Los Angeles Raiders players
Seattle Seahawks players
Oakland Raiders players
Arizona Cardinals players
New York Giants players
Calgary Stampeders coaches